The Belgian Foreign Trade Agency (BFTA) is a Belgian public institution, which is founded in 2002 to promote Belgian foreign trade.

History 

The Belgian Foreign Trade Agency was founded under the Cooperation Agreement of 24 May 2002 (only available in French and Dutch) agreed between the Federal Authority and the Regions. In recent decades, the competence for ‘foreign trade’ has undergone some phases of regionalisation in Belgium. Until 1990, the Belgian Foreign Trade Office (Belgische Dienst voor Buitenlandse Handel - Office belge du Commerce extérieur) was the most important institution for export promotion. In 1990, a Walloon agency Wallonia Foreign Trade and Investment Agency, was founded, followed by a Flemish equivalent in 1991 Flanders Investment & Trade. That same year, Brussels Invest & Export - now hub.brussels - was also founded.

The Agency has as Honorary Chairman His Majesty the King and as Chairman Didier Malherbe. Mrs  is vice-chairman of the Board of Directors of the Agency.

Financing 
The Agency is financed by an indexed federal allocation and by contributions from the Regions on the basis of the distribution scale regarding taxes on natural persons.

Activities 

The Belgian Foreign Trade Agency endeavours to provide support to the three Regions and the federal government in promoting foreign trade.

In accordance with Article 3 of the Cooperation Agreement dated 24 May 2002 between the Federal Government and the Regions, the Agency is responsible for:

 deciding on and organising joint trade missions linked to an initiative by one or several of the Regions or at the request of the Federal Government,
 organising, developing and disseminating information, studies and documentation about external markets to regional services responsible for foreign trade in accordance with Appendix 1,
 tasks of common interest decided unanimously by the board of directors. In December 2014, the Board therefore decided that the Belgian Foreign Trade Agency would, from 2015, contribute to the logistical organisation and the economic aspects of two State Visits abroad by the King and the Queen of Belgium per year.

1. Organisation of joint trade missions 
The Agency organises two joint trade missions a year in cooperation with the Wallonia Export-Investment Agency (AWEX), hub.brussels and Flanders Investment & Trade. In addition, the BFTA collaborates with the FPS Foreign Affairs, which is responsible for the protocol and political aspects of the programme. Companies from various industries take part in these missions, which chiefly focus on economic growth regions and countries. Belgian business representatives can establish high-level contacts with leading local industrial players, organisations and public bodies during these missions.

2. Information dissemination (on foreign markets) 

The Agency is also responsible for developing and disseminating information on foreign markets. Its Overseas Business Opportunities Centre specialises in the distribution of three types of trade information: overseas public tenders, international projects and trade proposals. The department also offers public procurement guidelines, specifications for a tender at cost, personalized foreign trade statistics subscriptions, newsflashes with economic information as well as market regulations. It organises seminars with experts in public contracts.

On April 1, 2015, a new package named Trade4U was launched, allowing companies to receive personalised business opportunities through an app. The BFTA also publishes econonomic studies, country studies and memos containing comparative national and international statistics about foreign trade. Finally, the agency also provides advice about international trade regulations and legislation.

References 

 https://www.abh-ace.be/en
 https://www.belgianeconomicmission.be
 https://belgianstatevisit.be

Foreign trade of Belgium
Government agencies of Belgium
Export promotion agencies